Nicole Skeltys is an Australian composer. From 1993 to 2003 she was part of B(if)tek, an electronica and dance act. Skeltys also released electronic music under the name Artificial during this period and was a member of Clan Analogue. In 2002, she was the writer for the webcomic Pigeon Coup. She co-composed the soundtrack for the first season of Lonely Planet TV series Lonely Planet Six Degrees. In 2004, Skeltys expanded her musical repertoire beyond pure electronica . She established a Melbourne-based band Dust, consisting of vocals, keyboards, guitar, bass and drums, and which has been described as a "mixture of country twang, melancholy folk and urban scrawl, all with psychedelic overtones". In late 2007, she established a psychedelic folk duo called The Jilted Brides with American filmmaker and photographer Tanya Andrea Stadelmann, and in 2008 and 2009 took up a number of artist residencies across the United States. In 2009, Skeltys became an artist in residence at Pittsburgh Filmmakers. Nicole produced a short music mockumentary, which won a platinum REMI award for group music video production in the 2012 Houston Worldfest international film festival.

In 2011, Skeltys and Byron Scullin produced the soundtrack to the documentary film A Life Exposed. In 2013, Skeltys released the compilation album Citizens United, followed by Deal with Your Disenchantment in 2018. About the latter album, she has been quoted as saying: "I wanted to reimagine myself looking at the world through Bob Dylan's eyes in the '60s/early '70s – only I'm a 21st-century woman, and the political and social issues are the ones we are dealing with now." After release of Deal with your Disenchantment, Skeltys performed at venues in London, the Northcote Social Club and the Ealing Blues Festival.

References

External links 
 Nicole Skeltys website

Year of birth missing (living people)
Living people
Australian electronic musicians
Australian webcomic creators
Female comics writers
Musicians from Melbourne
Musicians from Pittsburgh
Australian female comics artists